Enver is both a masculine given name and a surname. In Turkish, Albanian, Bosnian and Crimean Tatar, it is the transliteration of the Arabic name Anwar, which means "luminous". Notable people with the name include:

Given name
 Enver Ablaev (born 1979), Uzbek-born Ukrainian freestyle skier
 Enver Adrović (born 1969), Montenegrin retired footballer
 Enver Ahmed (1909–1992), Indian cartoonist
 Enver Alivodić (born 1984), Serbian footballer
 Enver Balkan (1902–1966), Turkish Olympic fencer
 Enver Baig, Pakistani politician and member of the Senate of Pakistan
 Enver Brandt (born 1991), South African rugby union player 
 Enver Cenk Şahin (born 1994), Turkish footballer
 Enver Čolaković (1913–1976), Bosnian writer and poet
 Enver Duran (born 1945), Turkish professor and medical doctor
 Enver Erdogan, Australian politician
 Enver Faja (1934–2011), Albanian architect and diplomat
 Enver Galim (1915–1988), Tatar writer and journalist
 Enver Gjokaj (born 1980), Albanian-American film and television actor
 Enver Hadri (1941–1990), Kosovar Albanian human-rights activist
 Enver Hadžiabdić (born 1945), Bosnian footballer and manager
 Enver Hadžihasanović (born 1950), Yugoslavian and Bosnian retired military general
 Enver Halilović, Bosnian ambassador
 Enver Hasani, Kosovar Albanian academic
 Enver Hoxha (1908–1985), Stalinist dictator of communist Albania
 Enver Hoxhaj (born 1969), Kosovar politician
 Enver Ibërshimi (born 1939), Albanian football player 
 Enver Idrizi, Croat-Albanian karateka
 Enver İzmaylov (born 1955), Crimean Tatar jazz musician
 Enver Jääger (born 1982), Estonian retired footballer 
 Enver Lisin (born 1986), Russian ice hockey player
 Enver Lugušić (born 1961), Bosnian goalkeeper
 Enver Maloku (1954–1999), Kosovar Albanian journalist
 Enver Mamedov (born 1923), Soviet diplomat
 Enver Marina (born 1977), Kosovan-Albanian footballer
 Enver Marić (born 1948), Bosnian footballer and coach
 Enver Mujezinović, former Yugoslav intelligence agent
 Enver Murad (1913–1999), Pakistani former diplomat
 Enver Ören (1939–2013), Turkish businessman
 Enver Petrovci (born 1954), Kosovar actor
 Enver Redžić (1915–2009), Bosnian historian and cultural observer
 Enver Sekiraqa (born 1972), Kosovar fugitive
 Enver Soobzokov (born 1978), Jordanian basketball player
 Enver Surty (born 1953), South African politician
 Enver Yulgushov (born 1938), Russian footballer and coach

Middle name
 Ali Enver Adakan (born 1977), Turkish retired dinghy sailor
 İsmail Enver (1881–1922), Ottoman Turkish military officer, usually known as Enver Pasha

Surname
Aslı Enver (born 1984), Turkish actress

See also
 24641 Enver, an asteroid
 Pioneers of Enver, pioneer movement functioning in Albania during the communist era
 Enver Creek Secondary School, a public high school in Canada
 Ənvər Məmmədxanlı, Azerbaijan, a village in Azerbaijan
 Anwar (disambiguation), the Arabic form of the name

Turkish-language surnames
Turkish masculine given names